Caldimonas manganoxidans is a Gram-negative, aerobic and thermophilic bacterium from the genus Caldimonas which has been isolated from a hot spring.

References

External links
Type strain of Caldimonas manganoxidans at BacDive -  the Bacterial Diversity Metadatabase

Comamonadaceae
Bacteria described in 2002